Tørskind Gravel Pit (Tørskind Grusgrav) is a former gravel pit converted into a sculpture park near Egtved, Vejle, Denmark. The sculptures were created by Robert Jacobsen (1912-1993) and Jean Clareboudt (1944-1997) over five years from 1986 to 1991. The park features works made of steel, granite and timber.

References

External links
Tourist Guide in English

Danish culture
Sculpture gardens, trails and parks in Denmark
Art museums and galleries in Denmark
Museums in the Region of Southern Denmark